Uakazuwaka Kazombiaze, also known as Wakka Kazombiaze (born 25 January 1979 in Okakarara), is a Namibian rugby union player with Birmingham & Solihull R.F.C. of England's National Division Two and the Namibia national rugby union team.

References

1979 births
Living people
People from Otjozondjupa Region
Namibian rugby union players
Rugby union locks
Namibian expatriate rugby union players
Expatriate rugby union players in England
Namibian expatriate sportspeople in England
Namibia international rugby union players